Rosenstein Castle is a palace in Stuttgart, Germany. It was designed in the classical style by the architect and court builder Giovanni Salucci (1769–1845) as the summer palace for King Wilhelm I of Württemberg and was built between 1822 and 1830.

Today, the building houses that part of the State Museum of Natural History Stuttgart dealing with extant lifeforms.

Participating artists
Artists who participated in the construction and decoration of the palace were as listed below. Key to the abbreviations:
NLE = No Longer Exists
RE = Restored
INT = Intact

Sculptors

Painters

Trivia
 Before the construction of the palace, the hill Rosenstein Castle stands on was called Kahlenstein as it was bare of trees. Afterwards, it became known as  Rosenstein because of the rose garden southeast of the palace.
 Directly under Rosenstein Castle is Württemberg's first railroad tunnel.

References

Museums in Stuttgart